The Amateur Adventuress is a lost 1919 American silent comedy film directed by Henry Otto and starring Emmy Wehlen. It is based on a short story by Thomas Edgelow that appeared in Young's Magazine (Oct. 1918). Maxwell Karger produced with release through Metro Pictures.

Cast
Emmy Wehlen as Norma Wood
Allan Sears as Oliver Morley
Eugene Pallette as George Goodie
William V. Mong as William Claxtonbury
Marian Skinner as Mrs. Claxtonbury
Lucille Ward as Mrs. Sentel
Victor Potel as Gregory Charles Sentel
Rosemary Theby as Flossie
Bonnie Hill as Bit Part (uncredited)

References

External links

1919 films
American silent feature films
Metro Pictures films
Lost American films
Films directed by Henry Otto
Films based on short fiction
American black-and-white films
Silent American comedy films
1919 comedy films
1919 lost films
Lost comedy films
1910s American films